USNS Henry Gibbins (T-AP-183) was a troop transport that served with the United States Military Sea Transportation Service (MSTS) during the 1950s. Prior to her MSTS service, she served as US Army transport USAT Henry Gibbins during World War II. She later served with the New York Maritime Academy as TS Empire State IV and with the Massachusetts Maritime Academy as USTS Bay State.

Henry Gibbins was one of four ships planned for the United States Lines North Atlantic service and ordered under Maritime Commission contract from the Ingalls Shipbuilding Company of Pascagoula, Mississippi with the allocated name of American Banker. Laid down on 23 August 1941; she was launched on 11 November 1942 as Biloxi.  She was delivered to the Army Transportation Service 27 February 1943 as Henry Gibbins and served the Army as a troop transport during World War II.

Refugee transport, WW-II
In accordance with President Franklin D. Roosevelt's 1944 executive order authorizing 1,000 refugees to enter the United States, 982 people boarded the ship, leaving Naples, Italy, in July, 1944, and making the trans-Atlantic crossing.

Following the war, the Henry Gibbins was refitted as a "war brides ship", a baby passenger liner. Three decks of cabins, lounges, two formal staircases, a formal dining room and substantial plumbing upgrades were installed, and the Army operated her to transport American military personnel and their dependents on a route between Bremerhaven and the US East Coast until she was transferred to the U.S. Navy in 1950.

Navy service
Henry Gibbins was acquired by the U.S. Navy from the U.S. Army on 1 March 1950, and assigned to the Military Sea Transportation Service. During the Korean War she transported men and equipment from New York City to the Caribbean and Canal Zone ports, prior to their assignment in the Pacific. In 1953, Henry Gibbins operated on the New York to Bremerhaven, Germany, and Southampton, England, runs, making a total of 12 cruises to these European ports.

From 1954 until late 1959 the veteran transport steamed from New York to the Caribbean over 75 times, sailed to the Mediterranean on 3 occasions and crossed the Atlantic to Northern Europe 8 times. During this time Henry Gibbins shuttled thousands of troops and tons of supplies between the United States and her foreign bases.

Henry Gibbins was transferred from MSTS to the United States Maritime Administration 2 December 1959, at Fort Schuyler, New York, for service with the New York Maritime College. The college named her TS Empire State IV and she retained that name until being transferred to the Massachusetts Maritime Academy in 1973. At that time she was renamed USTS Bay State.

During the winter of 1976-77, one of the coldest in fifty years, the Bay State suffered serious ice damage to her hull at her berth in Buzzards Bay at the southern end of the Cape Cod Canal. The hull plates were repaired and the ship continued  to serve as a training vessel for two more years. In the summer of 1977 she carried cadets to Europe.  In the summer of 1978 she made a training cruise to the Mediterranean.

The vessel was returned to the Maritime Administration after her final training cruise in 1978. Between the hull damage she had sustained in 1977, her age, and an increase in Massachusetts Maritime Academy's enrollment, she no longer suited the Academy's requirements.

According to the U.S. Maritime Administration, the ship was scrapped in 1983 after suffering an engine room fire.

References

Further reading
USAT Henry Gibbins - DANFS Online.
T-AP-183 Henry Gibbins, Navsource Online.

 

Type C3-P&C ships of the United States Army
Ships built in Pascagoula, Mississippi
1942 ships
World War II auxiliary ships of the United States
Type C3-P&C ships of the United States Navy
Korean War auxiliary ships of the United States
Ships of the Massachusetts Maritime Academy